Rajorhina is an extinct genus of stingray-like skate from the Upper Cretaceous of what is now Lebanon. It is the only known fossil-only genus of the family Rajidae  The genus is typified by a Rhombus form.

From its taxonomy a few things have been inferred about it. It likely lived in a marine environment and it was phosphatic based on its subphylum. It was actively mobile and a carnivore.

References

External links
 Images of Rajorhina expansa

Prehistoric cartilaginous fish genera
Late Cretaceous fish
Late Cretaceous fish of Asia